Tactusa minor is a moth of the family Erebidae first described by Michael Fibiger in 2010. It is known from northern Thailand.

The wingspan is about 11 mm. The forewing has a very large, blackish triangular patch, extending from the antemedial point on the costa to the apex, and to the tornus. Only the subterminal and terminal are lines visible, the former line is white, jagged, and the latter is marked by dark brown spots. The hindwing was dark grey, with an indistinct discal spot, and the underside is unicolorous grey.

References

Micronoctuini
Taxa named by Michael Fibiger
 Moths described in 2010